Macacine alphaherpesvirus 3 (McHV-3) is a species of virus in the genus Simplexvirus, subfamily Alphaherpesvirinae, family Herpesviridae, and order Herpesvirales.

References

Alphaherpesvirinae